Jim Black is an American jazz drummer who has performed with Tim Berne and Dave Douglas. He attended Berklee College of Music.

Career
His band AlasNoAxis includes Hilmar Jensson on electric guitar, Chris Speed on tenor saxophone and clarinet, and Skúli Sverrisson on bass guitar. The music is in some ways closer to post-rock than jazz, concentrating on rhythmic shifts and ensemble texture rather than featured solos. Since 2000 Winter & Winter has released several of the band's albums.

Pachora includes Black, Speed, Sverrisson, and Brad Shepik on tambura and electric saz. This band plays music that is rhythmically diverse and inspired by Balkan rhythms.

Black participated as drummer 12 in the Boredoms 77 Boadrum performance on July 7, 2007 at the Empire-Fulton Ferry State Park in Brooklyn, New York.

He is also one-third of the group BBC (Berne/Black/Cline) with alto saxophonist Berne and Nels Cline of Wilco. The group released the album The Veil in 2011.

Discography

As leader
 Malamute (Intakt, 2017)

With AlasNoAxis
 AlasNoAxis (Winter & Winter, 2000)
 Splay (Winter & Winter, 2002)
 Habyor (Winter & Winter, 2004)
 Dogs of Great Indifference (Winter & Winter, 2006)
 Houseplant  (Winter & Winter, 2009)
 Antiheroes (Winter & Winter, 2013)

With the Jim Black Trio
 Somatic (Winter & Winter, 2011)
 Actuality (Winter & Winter, 2014)
 The Constant (Intakt, 2016)
 Reckon (Intakt, 2020)

With Jim & The Schrimps
 Ain't No Saint (Intakt, 2023)

As co-leader
With Human Feel
 Human Feel (Human Use 1989)
 Scatter (GM, 1991)
 Welcome to Malpesta (New World 1994)
 Speak to It (Songlines, 1996)
 Galore (Skirl, 2007)
 Gold (Intakt, 2019)

With BB&C
 The Veil (Cryptogramophone, 2011)

As sideman
With Tim Berne
 Lowlife: The Paris Concert (JMT, 1995)
 Poisoned Minds: The Paris Concert (JMT, 1995)
 Memory Select: The Paris Concert (JMT, 1995)
 Unwound (Screwgun, 1996)
 Saturation Point (Screwgun, 1997)
 Discretion (Screwgun, 1997)
 Seconds (Screwgun, 2007)
 Insomnia (Clean Feed, 2011)
 Attention Spam (Screwgun, 2021)
 5 (Screwgun, 2021)

With Carlos Bica
 Azul (EmArcy, 1996)
 Twist (Enja, 1998)
 Look What They've Done to My Song (Enja, 2003)
 Believer (Enja, 2006)
 Things About (Clean Feed, 2011)
 More Than This (Clean Feed, 2016)
 Azul in Ljubljana (Clean Feed, 2018)

With Uri Caine
 Gustav Mahler in Toblach (Winter & Winter, 1999)
 Gustav Mahler: Dark Flame (Winter & Winter, 2003)
 Uri Caine Ensemble Plays Mozart (Winter & Winter, 2006)
 The Othello Syndrome (Winter & Winter, 2008)
 Rhapsody in Blue (Winter & Winter, 2013)

With Dave Douglas
 The Tiny Bell Trio (Songlines, 1994)
 Constellations (hat ART, 1996)
 Live in Europe (Arabesque, 1997)
 Songs for Wandering Souls (Winter & Winter, 1999)

With Ellery Eskelin
 Jazz Trash (Songlines, 1995)
 One Great Day... (hatOLOGY, 1997)
 Kulak, 29 & 30 (hatOLOGY, 1998)
 Five Other Pieces (+2) (hatOLOGY, 1999)
 Ramifications (hatOLOGY, 2000)
 The Secret Museum (hatOLOGY, 2000)
 12 (+1) Imaginary Views (hatOLOGY, 2002)
 Arcanum Moderne (hatOLOGY, 2003)
 Ten (hatOLOGY, 2004)
 Quiet Music (Prime Source, 2006)
 One Great Night...Live (hatOLOGY, 2009)

With Chris Speed
 Yeah No (Songlines, 1997)
 Deviantics (Songlines, 1999)
 Emit (Songlines, 2000)
 Swell Henry (Squealer, 2004)

With Pachora
 Pachora (Knitting Factory, 1997)
 Unn (Knitting Factory, 1998)
 Ast (Knitting Factory, 1999)
 Astereotypical (Winter & Winter, 2003)

With Endangered Blood
 Endangered Blood (Skirl, 2011)
 Work Your Magic (Skirl, 2013)
 Don't Freak Out (Skirl, 2018)

With Peter Evans
 Ghosts (More Is More, 2011)
 Destination: Void (More Is More, 2014)
 Genesis (More Is More, 2016)

With Satoko Fujii
 Looking Out of the Window (Ninety-One, 1997)
 Kitsune-bi (Tzadik, 1999)
 Toward to West (Enja, 2000)
 Junction (EWE, 2001)
 Bell the Cat! (Tokuma, 2002)
 Illusion Suite (Libra, 2004)
 Live in Japan 2004 (Natsat Music/PJL 2005)
 When We Were There (PJL 2006)
 Trace a River (Libra 2008)

With Hilmar Jensson
 Dofinn (Jazzis, 1995)
 Tyft (Songlines, 2002)
 Ditty Blei (Songlines, 2004)

With David Liebman
 Different but the Same (hatOLOGY, 2005)
 Renewal (hatOLOGY, 2008)
 Non Sequiturs (Hatology, 2011)

With Ben Monder
 Flux (Songlines, 1996)
 Dust (Arabesque, 1997)
 Excavation (Arabesque, 2000)

With others
 Laurie Anderson, Life On a String (Nonesuch, 2001)
 Laurie Anderson, Live at Town Hall New York City September 19-20 2001 (Nonesuch, 2002)
 Julian Arguelles, Live in Dublin (Auand, 2006)
 David Binney, South (ACT, 2001)
 David Binney, Balance (ACT, 2002)
 Theo Bleckmann, No Boat (Songlines, 1997)
 Stefano Bollani, Sheik Yer Zappa (Decca, 2014)
 Boredoms, 77 Boa (Drum Commmons, 2008)
 Marty Cook, Phases of the Moon (Tutu, 1994)
 Andrew D'Angelo, Skadra Degis (Skirl, 2008)
 Kris Davis, Save Your Breath (Clean Feed, 2015)
 Robert Dick, Third Stone from the Sun (New World/CounterCurrents 1993)
 Mark Dresser, Sedimental You (Clean Feed, 2016)
 Mark Dresser, Ain't Nothing But a Cyber Coup & You (Clean Feed, 2019)
 Peter Epstein, Staring at the Sun (MA, 1997)
 John Escreet, Sabotage and Celebration (Whirlwind, 2013)
 Michael Formanek, Nature of the Beast (Enja, 1997)
 Lee Konitz, Jugendstil II (ESP Disk, 2010)
 Donny McCaslin, Seen from Above (Arabesque, 2000)
 Raz Mesinai, Unit of Resistance (ROIR 2007)
 Anais Mitchell, Hadestown (Righteous Babe, 2010)
 Ikue Mori, Obelisk (Tzadik, 2017)
 Hank Roberts, Green  (Winter & Winter, 2008)
 Ned Rothenberg, Real and Imagined Time (Moers Music, 1995)
 Jamie Saft, Ragged Jack (Avant, 1996)
 Jamie Saft, Sovlanut (Tzadik, 2000)
 Ed Schuller, The Force (Tutu, 1996)
 Assif Tsahar, Jam (Hopscotch, 2003)
 Cuong Vu, Bound (OmniTone, 2000)
 John Zorn, Voices in the Wilderness (Tzadik, 2003)

References

External links
Official homepage
 77 Boadrum Site Profile Viva Radio, Sep 2007 (Flash)

American jazz drummers
Indie rock drummers
Berklee College of Music alumni
1967 births
Living people
American indie rock musicians
Avant-garde jazz drummers
Avant-garde jazz percussionists
American rock drummers
20th-century American drummers
American male drummers
20th-century American male musicians
American male jazz musicians
Kris Defoort Quartet members
Human Feel members
Winter & Winter Records artists
Intakt Records artists